Voetbalvereniging Scherpenzeel is an association football club from Scherpenzeel, Netherlands. Its ground is Sportpark De Bree-Oost.

History 
VV Scherpenzeel was founded on 17 April 1918.

The club initially played on Sundays. The Sunday team won section championships in the Zevende Klasse in 1997 and Vierde Klasse in 1984. In the 1980s a Saturday team was added, so much more successful than its Sunday counterpart that eventually Sunday football was dropped. The Saturday team won section championships in the Vierde Klasse in 1982 and 2014, Derde Klasse in 1984, and Tweede Klasse in 1985 and 2018.

In 2020 Scherpenzeel promoted for the very first time to the Hoofdklasse, based on a first-position finish (one point ahead of WV-HEDW) but no championship in the Eerste Klasse, after the season was cut short due to the COVID-19 pandemic in the Netherlands.

Chief coach

Saturday football 
  Dennis Koorn (2012–2015)
  Richard van Vliet (2015)
  Jan Gaasbeek (2015–2016)
  Dik Peters van Ton (2016–2019)
  Jürgen Schefczyk (since 2019)

Former players who turned professional 
 Simone van de Weerd
 Erik Willaarts

References 

Association football clubs established in 1918
1918 establishments in the Netherlands
Scherpenzeel
Scherpenzeel, Gelderland